P.O.W. - Bandi Yuddh Ke is an Indian political thriller television series developed by Nikkhil Advani, and is loosely based on the Israeli drama Hatufim. The series premiered 7 November 2016 on Star Plus. The show was featured at MAMI film fest followed by a talk with Gideon Raff, who developed Hatufim for Keshet and served as a consultant for this series. It went off-air after four months of its launch due to due to low viewership. The show streams on the Indian OTT platform MX Player.

Plot summary
After seventeen years in captivity, two soldiers, who seem to share a dark secret, return to their families. The two families try to pick up where they left off, while a government agent tries to expose their dark secret.
Meanwhile, the POWs try to acclimatise to the environment that they left 17 years ago.
The government agent tries several methods to expose these POWs but ends up in trouble.

Cast
 Amrita Puri as Harleen Kaur
 Sandhya Mridul as Nazneen Khan
 Purab Kohli as Naib Subedar Sartaaj Singh
Satyadeep Mishra as Squadron Leader Imaan Khan
 Manish Choudhary as Major Vikram Singh
 Rasika Dugal as Shobha Thakur
 Anurag Sinha as  Lt. Siddhant Thakur/Sadiq
 Sujata Kumar as Squadron Leader Iman Khan's Mother (Mrs khan)
 Arun Bali as Harpal Singh
 Parul Gulati as Afreen
 Suhaas Ahuja as Salim Khan
 Ghazal Thakur as Shaira Khan
 Krishh Pathak as Ayaan Khan
 Shivani Singh as Naina
 Ravinder Bakshi as Satpal Singh
 Ragini Sharma as Veera
Anindita Nayar as Dr. Nandini Kapoor
 Vrushabh Naik as Arjan
 Denzil Smith as Lala / Rashid Jamal
 Sahil Salathia as Yusuf
 Sameksha as Indira Jaisingh
 Pramod Pathak
 Abhishek Gupta as Santosh
 Kanisha Malhotra as Ananya
 Abhijeet Sooryvanshe

Production

Development
Star Plus approached Nikkhil Advani after watching his latest film D-Day, to direct a show based on the similar plotline on their channel. Star Plus had him watch both Hatufim and its American counterpart Homeland. Advani sought to make a show like Hatufim since he thought a show like Homeland would not suite Indian's sensibilities.

The budget of the series was ₹35 crores, and was shot in 90 locations along with about 150 crew members and with a budget of ₹27 Lakh per episode. The series was planned as a finite one for 126 episodes. However, due to very less viewership, it ended with 110 episodes.

Casting
Advani decided to rope in Amrita Puri, Purab Kohli, Satyadeep Misra, Manish Chaudhary and Sandhya Mridul – the former debuting on the small screen and the latter returning on the small screen after a hiatus of two years. Sahil Salathia, Anurag Sinha and Parul Gulati make a major entry post Episode 60 in the series as the further story unveils. Theater actor Abhishek Gupta plays RAW officer Santosh and Lala (Rashid Jamaal) is played by Denzil Smith in the series.

Music 
Arjunna Harjaie made his television debut with this show. He composed all the music tracks, background score, soundtrack, and also sung some songs except the title track.

Critical reception
Gursimran Kaur Bangal of The Times of India said "The show has managed to hold us all through the three episodes aired so far. The narrative is gripping and stirs you emotionally. It keeps you glued to what will happen next. This one is not to be missed!" Anvita Singh of India Today praised the show's unique plot, strong female characters, actors and the good cliffhanger. Mid-Day has compared the show with its American counterpart and considered that while it aids in etching the underlying theme of the series, the treatment given to the two adaptations are significantly distanced from one another. The Quint stated that the reunion scene of two prisoners could have been shown separately instead of showing both simultaneously in a single frame. It reviewed, "The new mega show of Star Plus, P.O.W.- Bandi Yuddh Ke lies somewhere between the ambition of cinema to be restrained and the dimness of television to be understood. It chugs along well with occasional attempts of expansive frames, overhead shots, and an enlightened understanding of relationships till the key scene - which quite honestly, disappoints."

The show also won several awards including Jury award for best Asian show at Seoul International drama awards and for its promotion and music at the Abby. It also had 12 nominations at the ITA awards, winning in categories such as: Best Drama-Jury, Best Actor-Jury (Purab Kohli), Best Actor in a Negative Role (Denzil Smith).

References

External links
 

Indian crime television series
Detective television series
2010s Indian television miniseries
StarPlus original programming
2016 Indian television series debuts
2017 Indian television series endings
Espionage television series
Serial drama television series
Indian political television series
Television shows set in Delhi
Television shows set in Punjab, India
Television shows set in Jammu and Kashmir
Indian Armed Forces in fiction
Research and Analysis Wing in fiction
Kashmir conflict in fiction